The 2009 CONCACAF Gold Cup was the tenth edition of the CONCACAF Gold Cup competition, and the twentieth soccer championship of North America, Central America and the Caribbean (CONCACAF). It was played from July 3 to 26, 2009 in the United States. This competition was the fourth tournament without guests from other confederations. Mexico won their fifth Gold Cup, and eighth CONCACAF Championship overall, after beating the United States 5–0 in the final. It was the second consecutive Gold Cup final and fourth overall to feature Mexico and the United States and the third won by Mexico.

Qualified teams
A total of 12 teams qualified for the tournament. Three berths were allocated to North America, five to Central America, and four to the Caribbean.

Notes:

Venues
The set of thirteen venues—the largest number ever used to stage the Gold Cup—was announced on March 9.

Squads

Participating teams selected a squad of 23 players (including three goalkeepers), except the United States, who were given an expanded 30-player roster due to their participation in the 2009 FIFA Confederations Cup.

Match officials

 Paul Ward
 Wálter Quesada
 Joel Aguilar
 Walter López
 José Pineda

 Courtney Campbell
 Benito Archundia
 Marco Antonio Rodríguez
 Roberto García
 Roberto Moreno

 Enrico Wijngaarde
 Geoffrey Hospedales
 Neal Brizan
 Jair Marrufo
 Terry Vaughn

Group stage

The twelve teams that qualified were divided into three groups. The draw for the Group Stage was announced on April 2, 2009. The top two teams in each group advanced to the knockout stage along with the best two of the third-place teams, filling out the knockout field of eight.

Group A

Group B

Group C

Ranking of third-placed teams

Knockout stage

Quarter-finals

Semi-finals

Final

Statistics

Goalscorers
4 goals
 Miguel Sabah
3 goals
 Blas Pérez
2 goals

 Ali Gerba
 Celso Borges
 Andy Herron
 Álvaro Saborío
 Osael Romero
 Carlo Costly
 Walter Martínez
 Gerardo Torrado
 Giovani dos Santos
 Pablo Barrera
 Guillermo Franco
 Luis Tejada
 Kenny Cooper
 Stuart Holden

1 goal

 Patrice Bernier
 Marcel de Jong
 Walter Centeno
 Warren Granados
 Pablo Herrera
 Froylán Ledezma
 Alexandre Alphonse
 Stéphane Auvray
 David Fleurival
 Ludovic Gotin
 Loïc Loval
 Monès Chéry
 James Marcelin
 Fabrice Noël
 Vaniel Sirin
 Roger Espinoza
 Melvin Valladares
 Omar Cummings
 José Antonio Castro
 Luis Miguel Noriega
 Carlos Vela
 Nelson Barahona
 Gabriel Enrique Gómez
 Freddy Adu
 Davy Arnaud
 Kyle Beckerman
 Brian Ching
 Charlie Davies
 Clarence Goodson
 Santino Quaranta
 Robbie Rogers

Awards

Winners

Individual awards

All-Tournament Team
The All-Tournament Team was selected by the CONCACAF Technical Study Group. The player selections were made from the eight teams that reached the quarterfinals of the 2009 CONCACAF Gold Cup.

Media coverage

In Australia, the tournament was broadcast by Setanta Sports

In Brazil, the tournament was broadcast by Multisports

In Canada, the tournament was broadcast by Rogers Sportsnet and GolTV Canada

In Costa Rica, the tournament was broadcast by Teletica Canal 7, XPERTV 33 and Repretel

In Mexico and Central America, the tournament was broadcast by Televisa and TV Azteca (Mexico and United States Matches) and SKY México

In Honduras, Televicentro was broadcasting in three of their channels, MegaTV, Tele Sistema, Canal 7y4.

In Panama, the tournament was broadcast by RPC TV Canal 4 and TV Max.

In Malaysia, the tournament was broadcast by Astro Supersports.

In the United States, English language coverage of games involving the US, as well as one game from each round of the knockout stages even if the USA was not involved, was on Fox Soccer Channel. All tournament games received Spanish language coverage split between Galavision, TeleFutura, Univision.

Worldwide, except in the Americas, the tournament was streamed by Omnisport.TV the legal online rights holder working in partnership with CONCACAF, with English commentary and in HDTV quality.

References

External links

 CONCACAF Gold Cup 2009 – Official Website for CONCACAF
 CONCACAF Gold Cup 2009 – Official Website for Gold Cup

 
2009
Concacaf Gold Cup
CONCACAF Gold Cup 2009
Gold Cup
CONCACAF Gold